Jóannes Kalsø Danielsen (born 10 September 1997) is a Faroese footballer who plays as a midfielder for Danish 2nd Division club Næstved Boldklub and the Faroe Islands national team.

Club career
On 28 December 2021, Danielsen signed with Danish 2nd Division leader Næstved Boldklub, after having played for KÍ since 2015.

International career
Danielsen made his international debut for the Faroe Islands on 15 October 2019 in a UEFA Euro 2020 qualifying home match against Malta.

Career statistics

International

References

External links
 
 
 
 Profile at FaroeSoccer.com

1997 births
Living people
People from Klaksvík
Faroese footballers
Faroe Islands under-21 international footballers
Faroe Islands international footballers
Association football midfielders
KÍ Klaksvík players
Næstved Boldklub players
Faroe Islands Premier League players
1. deild players
Faroese expatriate footballers
Expatriate men's footballers in Denmark